Milorad Žižić (born 1 December 1986), nicknamed Mićko, is a Montenegrin boxer.

Professional career 
Zizic made his professional boxing debut on May 20, 2011 when he beat Croatian boxer Renato Gogošević in Belgrade. In 2012 he became the IBF World Junior Champion. In 2013 he won the WBC Mediterranean title.

In 2014 he signed an exclusive deal with the former four-division world champion Roy Jones Jr.

Professional boxing record 

| style="text-align:center;" colspan="8"|12 Wins (6 Knockouts), 1 Loss, 0 Draws
|-  style="text-align:center; background:#e3e3e3;"
|  style="border-style:none none solid solid; "|Res.
|  style="border-style:none none solid solid; "|Record
|  style="border-style:none none solid solid; "|Opponent
|  style="border-style:none none solid solid; "|Type
|  style="border-style:none none solid solid; "|Rd., Time
|  style="border-style:none none solid solid; "|Date
|  style="border-style:none none solid solid; "|Location
|  style="border-style:none none solid solid; "|Notes
|- align=center
|Win||12-1||align=left| Rahman Mustafa Yusubov
|||||
|align=left|
|- align=center
|Loss||11-1||align=left| Louis Rose
|||||
|align=left|
|align=left|
|- align=center
|Win||11-0||align=left| Dennis Sharpe
|||||
|align=left|
|- align=center
|Win||10–0||align=left| Mehmet Karaka
|||||
|align=left|
|- align=center
|Win||9–0||align=left| Francesco Basile
|||||
|align=left|
|align=left|
|- align=center
|Win||8–0||align=left| Michal Pechacek
|||||
|align=left|
|align=left|
|- align=center
|Win||7–0||align=left| Mamadou Thiam
|||||
|align=left|
|- align=center
|Win||6–0||align=left| Mugurel Sebe
|||||
|align=left|
|- align=center
|Win||5–0||align=left| Youssouf Doumbia	
|||||
|align=left|
|- align=center
|Win||4–0||align=left| Valentin Stoychev
|||||
|align=left|
|- align=center
|Win||3–0||align=left| Rumen Kostov
|||||
|align=left|
|- align=center
|Win||2–0||align=left| Julius Rafael
|||||
|align=left|
|- align=center
|Win||1–0||align=left| Renato Gogosevic
|||||
|align=left|
|align=left|

References

External links
Milorad Zizic Box Rec profile
Milorad Zizic and Floyd Mayweather Sr. talk about the young prospect
Exclusive Photos: Milorad ‘Micko’ Zizic signs deal with Roy Jones Jr. Boxing
Zizic family website

Montenegrin male boxers
1986 births
Living people
Sportspeople from Nikšić
Middleweight boxers